Ricardo Costa may refer to:
Ricardo Costa (footballer, born 1981), Portuguese football defender
Ricardo Costa (footballer, born 1973), Portuguese former football midfielder
Ricardo Valter da Costa (born 1981), Brazilian former football midfielder
Ricardo Mion Varella Costa (born 1982), Brazilian former football forward
Ricardo Costa de Oliveira (born 1982), Brazilian athlete